The 2017 Fergana Challenger was a professional tennis tournament played on hard courts. It was the 18th edition of the tournament for men which was part of the 2017 ATP Challenger Tour, and the seventh edition of the event for women on the 2017 ITF Women's Circuit. It took place in Fergana, Uzbekistan between 19 and 25 June 2017.

Men's singles main draw entrants

Seeds 

 1 Rankings as of 12 June 2017.

Other entrants 
The following players received wildcards into the singles main draw:
  Sharobiddin Abzalov
  Saida'Lo Saidkarimov
  Amal Sultanbekov
  Azizkhon Turgunov

The following players received entry from the qualifying draw:
  Sergey Betov
  Timur Khabibulin
  Dmitry Surchenko
  Pavel Tsoy

Women's singles main draw entrants

Seeds 

 1 Rankings as of 12 June 2017.

Other entrants 
The following players received wildcards into the singles main draw:
  Laylo Bakhodirova
  Dariya Detkovskaya
  Shakhnoza Khatamova
  Sarvinoz Saidhujaeva

The following players received entry from the qualifying draw:
  Milena Amedieva
  Prerna Bhambri
  Angelina Gabueva
  Yasmina Karimjanova
  Varvara Kuznetsova
  Polina Merenkova
  Gulchekhra Mukhammadsidikova
  Vera Zvonareva

Champions

Men's singles 

  Ilya Ivashka def.  Nikola Milojević 6–4, 6–3.

Women's singles 
  Sabina Sharipova def.  Elena Rybakina, 6–4, 7–6(7–5)

Men's doubles 

  Sriram Balaji /  Vishnu Vardhan def.  Yuya Kibi /  Shuichi Sekiguchi 6–3, 6–3.

Women's doubles 
  Nigina Abduraimova /  Anastasia Frolova def.  Ksenia Lykina /  Sabina Sharipova, 7–6(9–7), 7–5

External links 
 2017 Fergana Challenger at ITFtennis.com
 Official website

2017 ATP Challenger Tour
2017 ITF Women's Circuit
2017